Come Together: America Salutes The Beatles is a tribute album to The Beatles. Released in April 1995 (see 1995 in country music) on Liberty Records, the album features covers of various Beatles songs, as performed by country music artists. The album cover features artwork by John Lennon.

Content
Steve Wariner's cover of "Get Back" charted at number 72 on Hot Country Songs in 1995. Sammy Kershaw's cover of "If I Fell" later appeared on his 2000 compilation Covers the Hits.

Track listing

Personnel
Per liner notes.
Technical
 Jerry Crutchfield — production (all tracks except 3, 8, 11, 14), executive production
 Martin Crutchfield — production (all tracks except 3, 8, 11, 14)
 Kyle Lehning — production (track 11)
 Michael Omartian — production (track 14)
 Jimmie Lee Sloas — production (track 8)
 Don Was — production (track 3)

Chart performance

References

Country albums by American artists
The Beatles tribute albums
1995 compilation albums
Liberty Records compilation albums
Country music compilation albums
Albums produced by Jerry Crutchfield